Ali Al-Mufidi (Arabic:علي المفيدي) (September 10, 1939 – October 28, 2008) was a Kuwaiti actor and movie director.

Works

Movies 
bas ya bahar (1971)

Dubbing 
Future Boy Conan 
Dinosaur War Izenborg

References

1939 births
2008 deaths
Kuwaiti male actors
Kuwaiti male stage actors
Kuwaiti male film actors
20th-century Kuwaiti male actors
21st-century Kuwaiti male actors